NA-260 (Quetta-cum-Chagai-cum-Mastung) was a constituency for the National Assembly of Pakistan. The constituency was replaced by NA-267 (Mastung-cum-Shaheed Sikandarabad-cum-Kalat) and NA-268 (Chagai-cum-Nushki-cum-Kharan). The areas from Mastung District became part of NA-267 (Mastung-cum-Shaheed Sikandarabad-cum-Kalat) and the areas from Chagai District became part of NA-268 (Chagai-cum-Nushki-cum-Kharan).

Election 2002 

General elections were held on 10 Oct 2002. Hafiz Hussain Ahmed of Muttahida Majlis-e-Amal won by 39,013 votes.

Election 2008 

General elections were held on 18 Feb 2008. Sardar Al-Haaj Muhammad Umar Goragaje of PPP won by 40,773 votes.

Election 2013 

General elections were held on 11 May 2013. Abdul Rahim Mandokhail of Pakhtun-khwa Milli Awami Party won by 30,338 votes and became the member of National Assembly. After his demise in 2017 Mir Usman Badini was elected as the member of National Assembly.

References

External links 
Election result's official website
NA-260 Quetta-Cum-Ghagai-Cum-Nushki By-election Results

NA-260
Abolished National Assembly Constituencies of Pakistan